Horst Herold  (21 October 1923 – 14 December 2018) was a German police officer. He was the President of the Federal Criminal Police of Germany from 1971 to 1981. Under his leadership, the method for the systematic manhunt of Red Army Faction terrorists, called Rasterfahndung (dragnet), was introduced. He authored several essays on policing.

References 

1923 births
2018 deaths
German police chiefs